Fucellia maritima is a Palearctic and Nearctic species of kelp fly in the family Anthomyiidae. Adults are found in large numbers from March to September on the British Isles coast. The species is particularly attracted to Fucus sp. and Laminaria sp. seaweed.

References

Anthomyiidae
Taxa named by Alexander Henry Haliday
Insects described in 1838